Sergey Pavlov or Sergei Pavlov may refer to:

Sergey Alexandrovich Pavlov (born 1958), Russian actor, director
Sergei Aleksandrovich Pavlov (born 1955), Russian football couch
Sergei Nikolayevich Pavlov (born 1962), Russian football couch
Sergei Pavlovich Pavlov (1929–1993), Soviet youth leader, politician and diplomat
Sergey Pavlov (chess player) (born 1987), Ukrainian chess player